William P. Henderson (born 1883) was a Scottish professional footballer who played as a left half.

Career
Born in Dundee, Henderson played for minor local club Norwood before spells with Scottish League clubs Dundee and Heart of Midlothian. For the latter club he made 22 league appearances, scoring 3 goals, and also featured on the losing side in the 1907 Scottish Cup Final.

He signed for New Brompton of the English Southern League in 1908. He joined the club at the same time as another player also called William Henderson, and the two played alongside each other on six occasions. While his namesake was a regular in the New Brompton team, this Henderson appeared only sporadically, with the last of his eight Southern League appearances coming at home to Portsmouth on 12 December 1908.

He joined Bradford City in May 1909, leaving the club in July 1910 to sign for Grimsby Town. During his time with Bradford City he made four appearances in the Football League.

Sources

References

1883 births
Date of death missing
Scottish footballers
Dundee F.C. players
Heart of Midlothian F.C. players
Gillingham F.C. players
Bradford City A.F.C. players
Grimsby Town F.C. players
Scottish Football League players
Southern Football League players
English Football League players
Association football wing halves
Footballers from Dundee